The men's K-1 1000 metres event was an individual kayaking event conducted as part of the Canoeing at the 1960 Summer Olympics.

Medalists

Results

Heats
24 competitors first raced in three heats on August 26. The top three finishers from each of the heats advanced directly to the semifinals; two were eliminated due to not starting, and the remaining 13 competitors were relegated to the repechage heats.

Repechages
The repechages took place on August 26. The top three finishers in each repechage advanced to the semifinals.

Semifinals
The top three finishers in each of the three semifinals (raced on August 27) advanced to the final with the rest of the competitors eliminated.

Final
The final was held on August 29.

References
1960 Summer Olympics official report Volume 2, Part 1. pp. 248–50.
Sports-reference.com 1960 K-1 1000 m results.

Men's K-1 1000
Men's events at the 1960 Summer Olympics